Love Is is the eighth studio album by Kim Wilde, released in spring 1992.

Kim Wilde found herself working with Rick Nowels on this album, the same songwriter who had written for Belinda Carlisle and later for Madonna amongst others. Three of the eleven tracks were produced by him while the remaining eight were produced by Ricky Wilde.

The majority of the tracks on this album were co-written by Kim. She'd taken a long hard look at herself, resulting in the song "Who Do You Think You Are?", in which she reflects on how she had behaved through the years in her career. There were more love songs on this album; titles such as "Touched By Your Magic" and "Heart Over Mind" are an indication of the themes of the lyrics.
 
Nowels provided "Love Is Holy", a song that immediately struck a chord with Kim when she heard it in his studio in America.  It became the first single release, giving Kim her first UK Top 20 hit in nearly four years.  Although the following two singles fell short of equalling its success, the project as a whole was well received by critics, who noted the Carlisle connection in some tracks. The rest of the album, however, was more consistent with the Wilde sound: guitar riffs over synths. Overall, the sound is more introspective and organic than the commercial pop of Love Moves, and especially haunting was the closing track, "Too Late", in which the loss of love is described in mournful tones. Mick Karn was credited for the bass on "Try Again".

Critical response
Tim Marsh of Q described "Love Is Holy" as "by far the strongest here" and was positive about mid-tempo tracks such as "Touched by Your Magic" in which Wilde demonstrates the range of her voice.

Track listing
"Love Is Holy" (Rick Nowels, Ellen Shipley) - 4:03
"Who Do You Think You Are?" (Kim Wilde, Ricky Wilde) - 3:48
"I Believe in You" (Ricky Wilde, Mick Silver) - 4:08
"Touched by Your Magic" (Ricky Wilde, Mick Silver) - 4:36
"I Won't Change the Way That I Feel" (Kim Wilde, Rick Nowels) - 4:07
"Million Miles Away" (Kim Wilde, Ricky Wilde) - 4:08
"The Light of the Moon (Belongs to Me)" (Kim Wilde, Ricky Wilde, Steve Byrd) - 4:15
"Heart Over Mind" (John Hall, David Munday, Sandy Stewart, Nicholas Whitecross) - 4:07
"A Miracle's Coming" (Kim Wilde, Ricky Wilde, Rick Nowels) - 4:00
"Try Again" (Kim Wilde, Ricky Wilde) - 4:23
"Too Late" (Kim Wilde, Steve Byrd) - 3:59

Personnel 
 Kim Wilde – lead and backing vocals 
 Charles Judge – keyboards (1, 5, 9)
 Ricky Wilde – keyboards (2, 3, 4, 6, 7, 8, 10, 11), programming (2, 3, 4, 6, 7, 8, 10, 11), guitars (2, 6), bass (2, 3, 4, 6, 7, 11), backing vocals (4, 8, 10)
 David Munday – keyboards (8), programming (8), guitars (8), backing vocals (8)
 Rusty Anderson – guitars (1, 5, 9)
 Steve Byrd – guitars (3, 4, 6, 10, 11)
 Davey Johnstone – mandolin (5), sitar (5)
 John Pierce – bass (5, 9)
 Mick Karn – bass (10)
 Curt Bisquera – drums (1)
 Geoff Dugmore – drums (2, 7, 10, 11)
 Rudy Richman – drums (5, 9)
 Rick Nowels – arrangements (1, 5, 9)
 Paul Buckmaster – string arrangements and conductor (5)
 Valerie Pinkston – backing vocals (1, 5, 9)
 Frances Ruffelle – backing vocals (1, 5, 9)
 Ellen Shipley – backing vocals (1, 5, 9)
 Junior Giscombe – backing vocals (4)
 Jordan Bailey – backing vocals (6)
 Roxanne Wilde – backing vocals (7)

Production 
 Rick Nowels – producer (1, 5, 9)
 Ricky Wilde – producer (2, 3, 4, 6, 7, 8, 10, 11), mixing (2, 3, 4, 6, 7, 8, 10, 11)
 Kevin W. Smith – engineer (1, 5, 9)
 James Richards – engineer (2, 3, 4, 6, 7, 8, 10, 11), mixing (4)
 Stephen Steater – engineer (2, 3, 4, 6, 7, 8, 10, 11)
 John Kovorek – additional engineer (1, 5, 9)
 Greg Grill – assistant engineer (1)
 Darian Sahanaja – assistant engineer (5, 9)
 Steve MacMillan – mixing (1, 5, 9)
 John Chamberlain – mix assistant (1, 5, 9)
 Tony Swain – mixing (2, 3, 4, 6, 7, 8, 10, 11)
 James Richards – mixing (4)
 Pete Schweir – mixing (8)
 Laura Harding – production coordinator (1, 5, 9)
 Sammy Farrington – art direction, design 
 Zanna – photography 
 Sam McKnight – hair stylist 
 Dick Page – make-up

Charts

Weekly charts

Year-end charts

Certifications and sales

References

External links

1992 albums
Kim Wilde albums
Albums produced by Rick Nowels
MCA Records albums